La Mission is a 2009 drama film starring Benjamin Bratt and Jeremy Ray Valdez. It is written and directed by Peter Bratt (Benjamin's brother). The film premiered at the 2009 Sundance Film Festival and screened at various festivals, including the San Francisco International Film Festival and the Palm Springs International Film Festival. It received a limited release beginning April 9, 2010.

Premise
Che Rivera is a reformed inmate living in the Mission District of San Francisco. A recovering alcoholic and bus driver by day, Che is respected throughout the Mission barrio for his masculinity and toughness. His hobby of building beautiful lowrider cars also makes him a beloved figure in the community. Che has raised his only son Jesse, a studious teenager, on his own since the death of his wife. Che  faces challenges to his personal values when he discovers Jesse is gay.

Cast

Production 
Writer-director Peter Bratt said among the challenging aspects of the film's production was raising financing, as he and brother Benjamin were told "more than a few times that 'the gay thing' had already been done and was now passe," referring to films and TV shows like Brokeback Mountain and Will & Grace. "In short order, what these people were saying was that the white experience is the universal one. When we tried to explain how much of a social taboo homosexuality remains in many communities of color, the reaction was often one of disbelief," said Bratt. The brothers could also not get support from the Latino and Native American communities, where homosexuality is also still considered taboo. 

Bratt considered filming the movie in New Mexico, where tax rebates allow for productions to be filmed relatively inexpensively. He ultimately settled on San Francisco's Mission District, saying, "In my mind it's one of the most unique American neighborhoods in the country and it has a dynamic that I don't think you can duplicate anywhere else. And the character of the neighborhood kind of informs the story."

The film was shot in 26 days.

Environmental impact
Several scenes in the movie make subtle hints at environmentally friendly themes, such as converting lowriders to run on biodiesel. The film was also shot on an eco-friendly movie set, one of the first of its kind in San Francisco. The cast and crew eliminated the use of water bottles and used composting on set, while the art department allowed for green product placement in the film. La Mission subsequently earned an Environmental Media Association (EMA) Green Seal Award in 2009 as the result of their production practices.

Release

Film festivals 
The film premiered at the 2009 Sundance Film Festival. It went on to play the festival circuit and was the opening night film at Outfest LA, the New York International Latino Film Festival, San Francisco International Film Festival, and the Artivist Film Festival. It also screened at the Independent Film Festival Boston, Austin Film Festival, Philadelphia QFest, American Indian Film Festival, and the Los Angeles Latino International Film Festival.

Theatrical 
The film opened on April 9, 2010, in New York City and Los Angeles and on April 16 in San Francisco. The DVD was released on August 10, 2010. A soundtrack, Songs of La Mission, was released by Round Whirled Records.

Reception
Critic Roger Ebert gave the film 2½ stars out of 4, writing the "story is told earnestly and with some force" and the filmmakers' "hearts are in the right place, but the film tries to say too many things for its running time." Ebert noted "La Mission is forthright in avoiding easy answers", but he also felt the screenplay needed to give the characters more complexity. In contrast, James Greenberg of The Hollywood Reporter opined the Bratt brothers "capture the conflicts of the Latino community in which they were raised." Greenberg added the film is "an honest attempt to portray the destructiveness of violence in the Latino community." 

In a positive review for The Austin Chronicle, Marjorie Baumgarten wrote the "film oozes with location detail and a knowing sense of Latino culture." Baumgarten praised Benjamin Bratt's acting and added, "Peter Bratt’s script occasionally wallows in its melodramatic aspects but is, on the whole, an empathetic portrait of a man who struggles to work past his gut reactions." Latino media credited the film as being both authentic and genuine to various aspects of Latino American cultures.

Awards and nominations 
In 2010, La Mission received three Imagen Awards in the categories of Best Feature Film, Best Actor for Benjamin Bratt, and Best Supporting Actor for Jeremy Ray Valdez. 

At the 2011 GLAAD Media Awards, La Mission was nominated for Outstanding Film - Limited Release. It was also nominated for a Dorian Award for LGBTQ Film of the Year.

La Mission also received the award for International Human Rights - Best Feature at the Artivist Film Festival, and the Audience Award at the OUT Film Festival Connecticut. It received an Estela Award from the National Association of Latino Producers.

See also 
 List of hood films

References

External links
 
 

2009 films
2009 independent films
Hispanic and Latino American drama films
Hispanic and Latino American LGBT-related films
Films about anti-LGBT sentiment
Films about father–son relationships
Films set in San Francisco
Films set in the San Francisco Bay Area
Films shot in San Francisco
Hood films
Films about Mexican Americans
2009 drama films
Mission District, San Francisco
2000s English-language films
2000s American films